Willie's Roadhouse (formerly Willie's Place) is a channel on the Sirius XM Radio that specializes in playing traditional country music, as well as some older country hit songs.  It is available on channel 59 (previously 56) and Dish Network 6059 (previously 6056), until The Highway took Willie's Roadhouse's former spot.

Until July 10, 2006, this channel was called "Hank's Place", named for Hank Williams.  When this was announced, XM did not explain why the name was changed.  Since then, however,  Willie Nelson's face has appeared in print advertising for XM, meaning that he has signed an endorsement deal, like those earlier signed by Bob Dylan and Snoop Dogg, as well as many other celebrity figures in all walks of life (e.g. Oprah Winfrey and Dale Earnhardt Jr.).

It has since been announced that Nelson has taken over part ownership of the channel.

A program featuring cowboy poetry airs on Sunday nights.

On May 4, 2011, the channel was merged with The Roadhouse to make Willie's Roadhouse. As part of the merger, and in conjunction with the end of the Nashville! channel, the Grand Ole Opry moved its broadcasts to Willie's Roadhouse.

In 2018, it was announced that country artist Jeannie Seely would host a segment of the show on Sunday afternoons. "I’m so glad Jeannie Seely is on the Roadhouse. She is a good friend and will do a great job," commented Nelson.

In February of 2018, the channel attracted controversy in Canada by broadcasting the song "Squaws Along the Yukon" by Hank Thompson. The Canadian Broadcast Standards Council ruled that SiriusXM had breached Canadian broadcast standards by playing a song with discriminatory, degrading, and derogatory references to Indigenous women.

Core artists
Merle Haggard
Kenny Rogers
Willie Nelson
George Jones
Conway Twitty
Johnny Cash
Charley Pride
Loretta Lynn
Ronnie Milsap
Dolly Parton
Waylon Jennings
Patsy Cline
Tammy Wynette

See also
 Willie's Place – A former truck stop named after Willie Nelson

References

External links
 Willie's Roadhouse

Willie Nelson
Sirius Satellite Radio channels
XM Satellite Radio channels
Sirius XM Radio channels
Country radio stations in the United States
Radio stations established in 2001